Bubur pedas is a traditional porridge dish for the Malays both in Sambas, West Kalimantan (Indonesia) and Sarawak (Malaysia). It is usually served during Ramadan after the Muslim ending their fast on the iftar time.

Ingredients
Bubur pedas is made from finely ground sauteed rice and grated coconut. The stock is made either from tetelan (bony meat such as ribs) or chicken broth. Bumbu spices mixture include shallot, garlic, red chili pepper, bruised lemongrass, black pepper, galangal and salam leaf (Indonesian bayleaf). A number of vegetables, among others carrot, water spinach, fern leaf and kesum leaf, long beans, bean sprouts, bamboo shoots and diced sweet potato incorporated into the pot when the porridge is cooked. Fried shallots, anchovy and peanuts are added on top of the spicy porridge when served. Key lime juice, sweet soy sauce and sambal chili paste might be added as condiments.

History
This type of porridge comes from the Malays on Sambas in West Kalimantan and later adapted as the food for the Sarawak Malays.

See also

 Bubur cha cha
 Bubur ayam

References 

Indonesian cuisine
Malaysian cuisine